Zulham Malik Zamrun or Cristiano Zulham (born 19 February 1988, in Ternate, Indonesia) is an Indonesian tarkam footballer who plays as a winger for Liga 2 club Persela Lamongan.

Personal life
Zulham Zamrun was born in Ternate, Maluku, the son to Malik Zamrun- a scout of Persiter Ternate. He has a twin brother Zulvin Zamrun who is also a professional footballer.

International career
He made his debut for the Indonesian national football team in a friendly match against Saudi Arabia on October 7, 2011, where he played as a substitute.

Career statistics

International

International goals

|}

Honours

Club
Persib Bandung
 Indonesia President's Cup: 2015

PSM Makassar
 Piala Indonesia: 2019

International 
Indonesia
 AFF Championship runner-up: 2016

Individual
 Piala Indonesia Top Goalscorer: 2019 (10 goals)
 President's Cup Top Goalscorer: 2015 (6 goals)
 Piala Indonesia Best Player: 2019
 President's Cup Best Player: 2015

References

External links
 
 

1988 births
Living people
Indonesian footballers
People from Ternate
Sportspeople from North Maluku
Indonesia international footballers
Persiter Ternate players
Persigo Gorontalo players
Pro Duta FC players
Persela Lamongan players
Mitra Kukar players
Liga 1 (Indonesia) players
Indonesian twins
Twin sportspeople
Association football wingers